A space suit is a system of garments for use in outer space.

Space suit may also refer to:

 A song from They Might Be Giants' 1992 album Apollo 18
 The pilot episode of Mickey Mouse Clubhouse